Argema fournieri is a moth of the family Saturniidae. It is found in Cameroon and Nigeria.

The larvae have been recorded feeding on Liquidambar and Rhus species.

References

Moths described in 1971
fournieri
Moths of Africa